The city of Ottawa, Canada held municipal elections on December 9, 1946.

Mayor of Ottawa

Referendum
(Only property owners could vote in the referendum)

Ottawa Board of Control
(4 elected)

Ottawa City Council
(2 elected from each ward)

References
Ottawa Citizen, December 10, 1946

Municipal elections in Ottawa
Ottawa
1940s in Ottawa
1946 in Ontario
December 1946 events in North America